The Pawnee Fire was a large wildfire that burned in Spring Valley in Lake County, California, in the United States. The fire started on June 23, 2018, and quickly expanded overnight, destroying 12 structures, and causing the evacuation of the entire Spring Valley area. The fire destroyed 22 structures, damaged six structures, and burned a total of  before it was fully contained on July 8, 2018.

Timeline

June
The Pawnee Fire was reported on June 23, 2018 around 5:21 p.m. on Pawnee Rd. and New Long Valley Rd. in Spring Valley in California, near Clearlake Oaks. After further investigation, the fire was cited as being off Quail Trail. The fire is located on a ridge, making it hard to access for fire crews.  Driven by dry conditions, high temperatures and gusty winds, the fire grew to  overnight and had destroyed twelve structures, including ten homes. Mandatory evacuations were put in place for the Spring Valley community. 

Authorities closed select intersections along California State Route 20. On June 26, additional road closures were put in place along Highway 20 and intersections off Brim Road.

On June 30, the fire has burned  and is 73 percent contained. Mandatory evacuations remain in place for Double Eagle and evacuation advisories were put in place for numerous areas off Highway 20.

July

The fire continued to threaten 50 buildings, with over 2,000 crews fighting the fire. Additional road closures were put in place. The fire continue to grow - both in containment and size. Thus far, 22 buildings were destroyed and six` were damaged, with 50 remaining threatened entering into the Fourth of July week. One firefighter was reported injured.

Late on July 8, the Pawnee Fire was fully contained, with the burn area totaling .

Impact

The Pawnee Fire impacted residents of the Spring Valley community, who went under mandatory evacuation on June 23, the day the fire was reported. Authorities shut down access to Spring Valley from Highway 20. Residents of the Walker Ridge and Double Eagle neighborhoods were under mandatory evacuation for the majority of the time until the fire's containment.

The fire destroyed a total of 22 structures, including 12 homes in Spring Valley. One firefighter was injured.

See also
October 2017 Northern California wildfires
Tubbs Fire
Thomas Fire

References

June 2018 events in the United States
Wildfires in Lake County, California
2018 California wildfires
July 2018 events in the United States